The 2005 Montreal Alouettes finished second place in the East Division with a 10–8 record. This was a disappointing season, by Alouettes standards, but they made it to the Grey Cup the hard way. They hosted the East Semi-Final and defeated the Saskatchewan Roughriders at Olympic Stadium, 30–14. They then traveled to Toronto to face the Argonauts at the Skydome, and they won 33–17, to advance to the Grey Cup. After a hard fought game they lost to the Edmonton Eskimos, 38–35 in what was only the second ever Grey Cup to be won in overtime.

Offseason

CFL draft

Preseason

Regular season

Season standings

Season schedule

Roster

Playoffs

Scotiabank East Semi-Final

Scotiabank East Final

Grey Cup

Awards

2005 CFL All-Star Selections
Kerry Watkins – Wide Receiver
Uzooma Okeke – Offensive Tackle
Scott Flory – Offensive Guard
Bryan Chiu – Centre
Richard Karikari – Safety

2005 CFL Eastern All-Star Selections
Ben Cahoon – Slotback
Kerry watkins – Wide Receiver
Robert Edwards – Running Back
Uzooma okeke – Offensive Tackle
Scott flory – Offensive Guard
Bryan chiu – Centre
Ed Philion – Defensive Tackle
Duane Butler – Linebacker
Richard karikari – Safety

2005 Intergold CFLPA All-Star Selections

References

Montreal Alouettes
Montreal Alouettes seasons